Mario Óscar Maldonado Ceballos (born 14 December 1949) is a Chilean football manager and former professional footballer who played as a centre-back for clubs in Chile and Mexico.

Club career
Born in Iquique, he began to play football at the age of 13, representing the local clubs Los Cóndores and Rubén Donoso as well as the Iquique city team from 1965 to 1967. Then, he moved to Santiago and joined Universidad Católica youth system, making his debut in the 1969 season, where he made ten appearances.

After playing for Universidad Católica, he played for Unión Española (1974–75), with whom he became the runner-up in the 1975 Copa Libertadores.

In 1975 he moved to Mexico and joined Tecos, recommended by his compatriots Fernando Riera and Carlos Reinoso. In the club, he also coincided with his compatriot Miguel Ángel Gamboa. With a brief stint with Universidad Católica in 1980, he also played for Coyotes Neza until 1986.

As an anecdote, he became the team captain in all clubs where he played.

International career
He took part of the Chile national team at youth level in 1969, when Fernando Riera was the manager. He made two appearances in friendly matches with views to the 1974 FIFA World Cup qualifiers.

At senior level, he took part of the Chile national team in friendly international tournaments and training sessions when Raúl Pino and Rudi Gutendorf were the managers.

Coaching career
Following his retirement, he began his career with Cachorros Neza. Next, he coached Irapuato, Tecos, Querétaro and Tecomán in Mexico.

He also had a stint with Deportes Iquique in the 1993 Primera División de Chile.

Other works
He got a Bachelor's Degree in Tourism at the UAG and worked at the same university as Director of Marketing Department.

Personal life
His father was a stevedore and his mother was a housewife.

References

External links
 
 

1949 births
Living people
People from Iquique
Chilean footballers
Chilean expatriate footballers
Chile under-20 international footballers
Club Deportivo Universidad Católica footballers
Unión Española footballers
Tecos F.C. footballers
Chilean Primera División players
Liga MX players
Chilean expatriate sportspeople in Mexico
Expatriate footballers in Mexico
Association football defenders
Chilean football managers
Chilean expatriate football managers
Irapuato F.C. managers
Tecos F.C. managers
Deportes Iquique managers
Querétaro F.C. managers
Liga MX managers
Chilean Primera División managers
Chilean association football commentators